Jacques Bergier (maybe born Yakov Mikhailovich Berger; Odessa,  Paris, 23 November 1978) was a chemical engineer, member of the French-resistance, spy, journalist and writer. He co-wrote the best-seller The Morning of the Magicians with Louis Pauwels as a work of "fantastic realism" (a term coined by the authors).

Early life 

Yakov Mikhailovich Berger, who later adopted the name Jacques Bergier, was born in Odessa in 1912.  In his autobiography, Je ne suis pas une légende ("I am Not a Legend"), Bergier tells that his surname was a transliteration error from a Polish official that turned his surname into "Bergier" (in Russian "e" is read "ye"). "Jacques" is the French for Yakov in Russian and Hebrew. 

Mikhail Berger, his father, was a Jewish wholesale grocer and his mother, Etlia Krzeminiecka, was a former revolutionary. A grand-uncle of his was a miraculous rabbi and in his autobiography, Bergier says he was a cousin of nuclear physicist George Gamow and of a certain Anatoly, a member of the firing squad that shot Tsar Nicholas II.

He was a gifted child: in his autobiography he said that at age two he read his first newspaper and at four he could easily read Russian, French and Hebrew. He was a speed reader (until the end of his life he could read four to ten books per day) and had an eidetic memory. He was a vivacious child, and he told fabulous sounding stories of discussing strategy with generals as well as talking with tramps, prostitutes, political activists and businessmen in the streets of Odessa. He never went to school but had private tutors.

In 1920 the Russian Civil War forced the Berger family to take refuge in Etlia's homeland in Krzemeiniec, Northwestern Ukraine. Young Yakov Mikhailovich went to a Talmudic school and he became enthralled with the study of the Kabbalah and its mysteries. Besides that he studied mathematics, physics, German and English. He read everything he could lay hands on, but his favourite reading was science fiction.

In 1925 the family moved to France. He was a pupil at the Lycée Saint Louis, then he studied mathematics, applied and general chemistry at the Sorbonne and finally he went to the École Nationale Supérieure de Chimie, where he graduated as chemical engineer.

From 1934 to 1939 he was an assistant to the noted French atomic physicist André Helbronner who was killed by the Gestapo towards the end of World War II. According to Walter Lang, Bergier was approached by Fulcanelli with a message for Helbronner about man's possible use of nuclear weapons. The meeting took place in June 1937 in a laboratory of the Gas Board in Paris.

During the Second World War and the German occupation of France, Bergier worked for the Réseau Marco-Polo at Lyon, a French Resistance network in contact with the supporters of Charles De Gaulle in London. From March 1944 until May 1945, Bergier was incarcerated in the Mauthausen-Gusen concentration camp.

Work

In 1954 Bergier met Louis Pauwels, a writer and editor, in Paris. They would later collaborate on the book Le Matin des Magiciens, which was published in France in 1960. This book takes the reader on a neo-surrealistic tour of modern European history focusing on the purported influence of the occult and secret societies on politics. It also attempts to connect alchemy with nuclear physics, hinting that early alchemists understood more about the actual function of atoms than they are credited.

Le Matin des Magiciens was very popular with the youth culture in France through the 1960s and 1970s. It was translated into English by Rollo Myers in 1963 under the title The Dawn of Magic. It first appeared in the United States in paperback form in 1968 as The Morning of the Magicians. This book spawned an entire genre of explorations into many of the ideas it raised, such as connections between Nazism and the occult. It has become a cult classic, often referenced by conspiracy theory enthusiasts and those interested in ideas of forbidden history and occult studies.

Pauwels and Bergier collaborated on two later books of essays, Impossible Possibilities and The Eternal Man. They also co-produced a journal called Planète which explored esoteric ideas.
Bergier was interested in the possibilities of extraterrestrial life and explored reported sightings of UFOs. In 1970 he published Les extra-terrestres dans l'Histoire (The extraterrestrials in history).

Jacques Bergier died in November 1978 saying of himself: "I am not a legend."

Popular culture
Bergier was the inspiration for Hergé's character Mik Kanrokitoff, featured in The Adventures of Tintin, Flight 714 to Sydney.

See also
Vril

References 

1912 births
1978 deaths
20th-century French novelists
20th-century French male writers
French chemical engineers
French male novelists
Soviet emigrants to France
20th-century French chemists
French science fiction writers
Mensans
Odesa Jews
Ufologists
20th-century French engineers
Mauthausen concentration camp survivors